O Retorno de Saturno (English: The Return of Saturn) is the fourth album by Detonautas, released in 2008 by Sony BMG. It is the first album without guitarist Rodrigo Netto, who was assassinated in 2006.

Track listing

 "O Retorno de Saturno"
 "Nada É Sempre Igual"
 "Verdades do Mundo"
 "Só Pelo Bem Querer" 
 "Lógica"
 "Tanto Faz"
 "Oração do Horizonte" 
 "Soldados de Chumbo"
 "Ensaio Sobre A Cegueira"
 "Enquano Houver..." 
 "Eu Vou Vomitar Em Você"

Credits 
 Tico Santa Cruz - Vocals and rhythm guitar 
 Renato Rocha - Lead guitar
 Cléston - DJ
 Fábio Brasil - Drums
 Fabrizio Ioro - Keyboards
 Fernando Magalhães - additional guitars
 Edu Planchêz - Special participation in "Ensaio Sobre A Cegueira" with the poetry "Filhos da Morte Burra" (Kids of the Stupid Death).

References

2008 albums
Detonautas Roque Clube albums